The 2017 Polish Basketball Cup  was the 53rd edition of Poland's national cup competition for men basketball teams. It was managed by the Polish Basketball League (PLK) and will be held in Warsaw, in the Arena Ursynów in February 2017.

Qualified teams
The eight first qualified after the first half of the 2016–17 PLK season qualified to the tournament. The highest placed four teams would play the lowest seeded teams in the quarter-finals.

Bracket

Final

References

Polish Cup
Polish Basketball Cup